Palabora Mining Company Limited (founded August 1956) is a publicly traded mining company headquartered in Phalaborwa, Limpopo province, South Africa. The company operates a single cluster of open-pit and underground mines producing mainly copper as well as byproducts such as precious metals from anode slimes, nickel sulfate, sulfuric acid, magnetite, and vermiculite. Palabora also has processing facilities on site for the production of purified copper from mined copper ore, and a vermiculite recovery plant. Its final copper product has two forms namely, copper cathode and copper rod.

In addition to its mining activities, Palabora maintains subsidiaries located in the United States, United Kingdom and Singapore for the marketing of vermiculite.

A majority of the company's stock is owned by the international mining conglomerates Rio Tinto Group (57%) and Anglo American PLC (17%), with the remaining 26% available as public float. The share's stock trades on the Johannesburg Stock Exchange under symbol PAM.

Owners
 Hebei Iron & Steel Group (35%)
 General Nice Group (25%)
 ISCOR (20%)
 Tewoo Group (20%)

References

1956 establishments in South Africa
Copper mining companies of South Africa
Economy of Limpopo
Non-renewable resource companies established in 1956
Open-pit mines
Rio Tinto (corporation) subsidiaries
Companies listed on the Johannesburg Stock Exchange